The 1984 FA Charity Shield (also known as the FA Charity Shield sponsored by General Motors for sponsorship reasons) was the 62nd Charity Shield, a football match contested by the holders of the Football League First Division and FA Cup. This edition featured a Merseyside derby between Liverpool and Everton at Wembley Stadium. Liverpool won the League and Everton won the FA Cup. The match was held on 18 August 1984 and was won 1–0 by Everton after an own goal from Bruce Grobbelaar. Graeme Sharp was straight in on goal and tried to round Grobbelaar, but the ball was blocked on the line by Alan Hansen and ricocheted straight at the shins of Grobbelaar and back into the net.

Match details

See also
1983–84 Football League
1983–84 FA Cup

References

External links
The FA Community Shield past winners

1984
Charity Shield 1984
Charity Shield 1984
Comm